The Fort Worth Stockyards is a historic district that is located in Fort Worth, Texas, north of the central business district. A  portion encompassing much of the district was listed on the National Register of Historic Places as Fort Worth Stockyards Historic District in 1976. It holds a former livestock market which operated under various owners from 1866.

History

The arrival of railroads in 1876 made the area a very important livestock center.  Fort Worth Union Stockyards opened for business on January 19, 1890, covering 206 acres.  On February 7, the Fort Worth Dressed Meat and Packing Company was founded.  This  facility was operated without profit until purchased by G. W. Simpson of Boston.  In an effort to produce revenue, they reached out to the Swift and Armour companies to establish packing houses.  By 1886, four stockyards had been built near the railroads. Boston capitalist Greenleif W. Simpson, with a half dozen Boston and Chicago associates, incorporated the Fort Worth Stock Yards Company on March 23, 1893, and purchased the Union Stock Yards and the Fort Worth Packing Company. The Stockyards experienced early success.  By 1907, the Stockyards sold a million cattle per year.  The stockyards was an organized place where cattle, sheep, and hogs could be bought, sold and slaughtered.  Fort Worth remained an important part of the cattle industry until the 1950s.  Business suffered due to livestock auctions held closer to where the livestock were originally produced.

Today

The listing included 46 contributing buildings and one other contributing structure. Recorded Texas Historic Landmarks within the district include the entrance sign, the Livestock Exchange Building, and the Thannisch Block Building housing the Stockyards Hotel. State Antiquities Landmarks also include the entrance sign as well as the Armour & Swift Plaza and the Cowtown Coliseum.

The Stockyards consist of mainly entertainment and shopping venues that capitalize on the "Cowtown" image of Fort Worth. Home to the famous boot making company M.L. Leddy's which is located in the heart of the Stockyards and The Maverick Fine Western Wear and Saloon where customers "can 'belly up' to the bar, relax and have a cold beer while in the Stockyards; just like they did in the days of the big cattle drives", as they shop around the store. The city of Fort Worth is often referred to as "Where the West Begins." Many bars and nightclubs (including Billy Bob's Texas) are located in the vicinity, and the area has a Western motif. There is also an opry and the weekend rodeos at Cowtown Coliseum. Some volunteers still run the cattle drives through the stockyards, a practice developed in the late 19th century by the frontiersman Charles "Buffalo" Jones, who herded buffalo calves through the streets of Garden City, Kansas.

On April 1, 2011, the Fort Worth Stockyards Stables were remodeled and reopened. They are located next door to the Hyatt hotel in an original Historic Stockyards building that was built in 1912. Moved to the Armour building after the 2015 remodel. The stables offers horse rentals on the open trails of the Trinity River and carriage rides. 

The Grapevine Vintage Railroad runs a heritage railway service between Grapevine station and The Stockyards.

Gallery

See also

List of Neighborhoods in Fort Worth, Texas
Grapevine Vintage Railroad
National Register of Historic Places listings in Tarrant County, Texas
Recorded Texas Historic Landmarks in Tarrant County

References

External links

Architecture in Fort Worth: North Side

Neighborhoods in Fort Worth, Texas
History of Fort Worth, Texas
Economy of Fort Worth, Texas
American frontier
Historic districts on the National Register of Historic Places in Texas
National Register of Historic Places in Fort Worth, Texas
Tourist attractions in Tarrant County, Texas
Mission Revival architecture in Texas
Spanish Revival architecture in the United States
Meat processing in the United States
Agricultural buildings and structures on the National Register of Historic Places in Texas
Agricultural buildings and structures on the National Register of Historic Places
Rodeo venues in the United States